This is a list of plant hybrids created intentionally or by chance and exploited commercially in agriculture or horticulture. The hybridization event mechanism is documented where known, along with the authorities who described it.

Hybrids

References

External links
 

Hybrids
Hybrids, list
Hybrids, list